Professor Janardan Chakravarti (1901-1987) was a renowned scholar in Vaishnav literature and a celebrated professor of Bengali. He was awarded the DLitt by the University of Calcutta for his contributions to Bengali literature.

Career 
His other specialization was on Bengali poet Madhushudan Dutta . Professor Chakravarti's literary contributions include a book on Vaishnava theology and literature entitled "Sri Radha Tatwa and Sri Chaitanya Sanskriti".It was delivered as Kamala Lecture in 1972 at the Calcutta University.

He wrote another book of Reminiscence "Smriti Bhare" in Bengali. Professor Chakravarti delivered the prestigious Biman Bihari Lecture series at the Asiatic Society which was later published as a book entitled "Bengal Vaishnavism and Sri Chaitanya".

He retired from the West Bengal Senior Education Service in 1955 from Presidency College and went on to become the Head of the Department of Bengali at Burdwan University. He was also associated with the Post Graduate Department of C. U. in the capacity of a Part time Lecturer. He served at two other institutions namely Muralidhar Girls’ College and  Maharani Kashishwari College in Kolkata as the Principal.

Books published 

 Bengal Vaisnavism and Sri Chaitanya
 Sri Radha Tatwa and Sri Chaitanya Sanskriti
 Smriti Bhare

References

20th-century Indian educational theorists
Academic staff of the University of Calcutta
Academic staff of the University of Burdwan
University of Calcutta alumni
1901 births
1987 deaths
Chittagong College alumni